Oman–Thailand relations is the official relationship between Oman and Thailand.

History
While two countries did not have too much ancient link, Ayutthaya Kingdom at 16th century had been one of the most active trade partners, including towards Arab traders. Omani traders, as part of Arab traders, developed healthy tie with the Siamese and even facilitated to the establishment of a Persian/Arab Muslim community that would remain in Thailand for centuries. This resulted with both Oman and Thailand became commonly prosperous in their medieval histories, respectively, attracted other Muslim traders to Thailand as well.

Today
Oman and Thailand would soon establish relations with the ascend of Qaboos bin Said al Said as Sultan of Oman in 1980.

Being two similar royal states, Oman and Thailand have sought to take advantages from this link. Since 1980s, trade between two countries increased. Two countries have engaged in political consultation since 2017.

Thailand is one of the most popular tourist destinations for Omanis outside the Gulf states, especially medical tourism.

Diplomatic missions
Oman has an embassy in Bangkok.
Thailand has an embassy in Muscat.

References

 
Thailand
Oman